Reg McKay (15 July 1953 – 19 October 2009) was a Scottish journalist with the Daily Record newspaper. He was also a former Director of Social Work with Argyll and Bute Council and a former Director of the Action for Children charity. As well as writing crime fiction, he penned several best-selling true-crime books over ten years.

Personal life/death
McKay's family moved from Aberdeenshire to Glasgow circa 1967. He attended Govan High School, Glasgow, until 1971, when he matriculated at the University of Glasgow. McKay had several top selling books before his death. McKay spent much of his life in Glasgow and spent his final years in Paisley, Renfrewshire, with his wife, Gerry, where he died from brain and lung cancer on 19 October 2009, aged 56.

External links
The Daily Record obituary

1953 births
2009 deaths
Deaths from cancer in Scotland
Deaths from brain tumor
Deaths from lung cancer
People from Argyll and Bute
Journalists from Glasgow
Scottish crime fiction writers
Scottish novelists
People educated at Govan High School
Alumni of the University of Glasgow
20th-century Scottish novelists
Scottish male novelists
20th-century British male writers